The Fight Network (formerly The Wrestling Channel, TWC and TWC Fight!) was a free-to-air digital satellite television sports channel in the United Kingdom and Ireland, devoted to airing programming related to boxing, mixed martial arts, pro-wrestling and other combat sports.

History

Pre-launch
The Fight Network UK began its run as The Wrestling Channel. The service was planned to launch as a full channel in March 2004, but began test-transmissions on 1 December 2003, as a temporary programming block on the now-defunct channel Friendly TV. This block aired from 7:00 to 8:00 in the daytime and evening on weekdays with repeats on weekend mornings from 9 to 11:00 am, and 6:00 pm. The block featured Wrestling promotions such as Classic Wrestling, Pro Wrestling Noah, Ring of Honor and Total Nonstop Action Wrestling, which would be the first time these promotions would ever air on a UK channel. The block was supposed to only last a month, but was extended in 2004 due to positive response from viewers.

Launch
On 15 March 2004, the channel fully launched on Sky Channel 427. The Wrestling Channel was the first channel of its kind in the world to strictly focus its programming on professional wrestling. Alongside shows that aired on the block on Friendly TV, shows from promotions such as New Japan Pro-Wrestling, Pro-Pain-Pro Wrestling and World of Sport. To promote the launch, the channel's parent company partnered up with game publisher Acclaim Entertainment and their then-upcoming game Showdown: Legends of Wrestling for a competition. In July 2004, The Wrestling Channel also became the first channel to air a news/talk show dedicated to pro-wrestling - titled The Bagpipe Report.

TWC Reloaded
On 25 October 2004, a sister channel called TWC Reloaded was launched next to The Wrestling Channel on Sky channel 428. The channel featured action from the existing TWC library and also experimented with new shows and formats. The channel was also going to air Mixed Marshal Arts programming, but this never came to fruition.

On 24 January 2005, The Wrestling Channel's parent company announced that the TWC Reloaded slot had been approached by a number of potential partners seeking to re-programme and develop the slot. Future output had been reduced to the minimum level of three hours per day, starting at 3:00 am, whilst a decision was taken over the content for the slot. From 1 March, a movie aired nightly on the channel and 2 days later, the channel effectively ceased as there was no longer any sporting content being transmitted. By 21 March, TWC Reloaded moved to the movie section of the Sky EPG at channel number 333 and was temporary renamed as Movies 333 in the process, where it would fully launch as True Movies.

Losses and revamp
By the end of 2004, The Wrestling Channel's parent company announced that they were running at a loss due to lower-than-expected viewing figures generating less revenue than it was costing to run the operation. They added that most promotions had been more than co-operative in allowing contract re-negotiations. To solve this, the channel signed a new deal with TNA to feature their events on a one-week delay basis. Ring of Honor was expanded into a new, exclusive two-hour weekly show, more promotions like ZERO1-MAX were added to the schedule, whilst Memphis Wrestling and Pro Wrestling Noah had even newer up-to-date weekly shows. Eventually, the channel indicated that viewer ratings had increased.

On 3 October 2005, The Wrestling Channel began to refer to itself more under its shortened name of TWC, as they began to add other fighting sports to their schedule in order to appeal to new viewers and non-Wrestling fans. During the month of November, the station added mixed martial arts and boxing programming to its existing schedule for the first time. By 1 July 2006 began broadcasting a full 24 hours a day, seven days a week without any Teleshopping. In that month, the channel began to air action movies.

TWC Fight, purchase by The Fight Network and Closure
The channel would eventually change its name to TWC Fight! on 4 December 2006, and added more mixed martial arts programming to their schedule, including Cage Rage Championships and King of the Cage. On 15 December 2006 TWC Fight! announced they had lost the rights to air TNA programming, which after 1 January 2007 had moved to Bravo 2.

In late 2007, Canadian based channel The Fight Network purchased TWC Fight! and in January 2008, the channel became a UK version of The Fight Network, owned by Dolphin Television. The Fight Network aired the same programming as before, just under a different name. By July 2008 the channel launched on Freesat channel 251.

After 6 years, the channel ceased transmission on 1 December 2008 at midnight and was removed from the Sky EPG a few hours later.

Relaunch as programming block

On 13 July 2018, it was announced that Anthem Sports & Entertainment Corp. would relaunch Fight Network as a programming block on Showcase by Information TV. The block would feature various sports, including live Impact Wrestling, Ultimate Challenge MMA, Abu Dhabi Grand Slam, WGP Kickboxing, Wrestling at the Chase and other programmes. Due to the way it is placed and the obscurity of the original version, Anthem are treating it as a new channel launch.

The block mainly focuses on Wrestling like its predecessor, with a mixture of other fighting sports as well.

Original programming

Professional wrestling 
 The Bagpipe Report
 Irish Whip Wrestling 
 Shoot interviews
 3PW
 Consejo Mundial de Lucha Libre
 Classic Memphis Wrestling
 Combat Zone Wrestling
 Frontier Wrestling Alliance
 Frontier Martial-Arts Wrestling
 GAEA Japan
 Icons of Wrestling
 LDN Wrestling: Capital TV
 Major League Wrestling
 Memphis Wrestling
 Pro Wrestling Noah
 ChickFight
 Real Quality Wrestling
 Ring of Honor
 NWA:Total Nonstop Action
 UWA Hardcore Wrestling
 World of Sport
 Wrestling at the Chase
 Wrestling Reality
 Xcitement Wrestling Federation

Combat sports 
 After The Bell 
 Ballroom Boxing
 Before The Bell
 Cage Rage Championships - Cage Fighter
 Hardcore Championship Fighting
 ICON Sport
 Knockout News
 One on One
 ROUGH
 So You Wanna Fight
 TKO Championship Fighting
 Tough Guy Cinema
 UK Boxing
 UK MMA
 Ultimate Combat Experience 
 X-treme Fighting Championship

See also

 Professional wrestling in the United Kingdom
 WWE Network
 WWE Network (Canada)
 WWE Classics on Demand
 NJPW World
 WWNLive

References

External links
 The Wrestling Channel via Wayback Machine
 TWC Fight! via Wayback Machine

Television channels and stations established in 2004
Television channels and stations disestablished in 2008
Defunct television channels in the United Kingdom
Sports television channels in the United Kingdom
Sports television channels in Ireland